Brian Warwick Goorjian (born 28 July 1953) is an American-Australian professional basketball coach and former player served as the head coach of the Bay Area Dragons of the East Asia Super League (EASL). He is also currently the head coach of the Australia men's national basketball team. He is the most successful coach in Australian basketball and his career has been called the most successful in NBL history by Basketball Australia. In an NBL coaching career spanning over 20 years, Goorjian has won six championships: two with the South East Melbourne Magic, three with the Sydney Kings and one with the South Dragons. He previously served as the head coach of the Australia men's team from 2001 to 2008 before returning as coach in 2020.

In 2009, Goorjian became the head coach of the Dongguan Leopards of the Chinese Basketball Association (CBA) and stayed with the team for six seasons. He served as an assistant coach for the Guangdong Southern Tigers from 2015 to 2016 and as a special advisor to the Shanghai Sharks from 2016 to 2018. Goorjian returned to coaching duties when he joined the Xinjiang Flying Tigers in 2018 as an assistant coach for one season. After spending a decade in the CBA, he returned to the NBL in 2020 as the head coach of the Illawarra Hawks.

Early career 
Goorjian was born in Glendale, California, and is of Armenian descent. He played on the basketball team at Crescenta Valley High School in La Crescenta, California, and was coached by his father, Ed. Goorjian's younger brothers, Kevin and Greg, also played basketball at Crescenta Valley. He played college basketball for the Pepperdine Waves.

Goorjian first arrived in Australia in 1977 to play for the Melbourne Tigers under head coach Lindsay Gaze. He served as the inaugural captain of the Tigers in their first National Basketball League (NBL) season in 1984.

Coaching career

Eastside Spectres (1988–1991) 
Goorjian's first head coaching job came in 1988 when he coached the Eastside Melbourne Spectres. The team missed the finals in Goorjian's first two seasons. In 1990, the Spectres bowed out in the semi-finals and the next year they went one better by making the Grand Final for only the second time in the club's history. They lost this final to the defending champion Perth Wildcats. The Spectres merged with the Southern Melbourne Saints during the 1992 offseason to form the South East Melbourne Magic with Goorjian named as the new Magic coach.

South East Melbourne Magic (1992–1998) 
Goorjian won the first of his six championships in 1992 against the Melbourne Tigers and was named the Lindsay Gaze Coach of the Year. Three consecutive semi-final losses were followed by a second championship and another Coach of the Year award in 1996 when they again defeated the Tigers. Two Grand Final losses were to follow to the Tigers in 1997 and the Adelaide 36ers in 1998.

Following the loss to the 36ers, Goorjian had another change of team by merger when the Magic merged with cross-town rivals the North Melbourne Giants to form the Victoria Titans.

Victoria Titans (1998–2002) 
Goorjian lost another two Grand Finals in his first two seasons as coach for the Titans. The Titans lost 2–1 to defending champions Adelaide in 1998–99 before being swept 2–0 by the Perth Wildcats in 1999–2000. At the end of the 2001–02 season, the financially struggling Victoria Titans went into administration and were sold to new owners associated with the former North Melbourne Giants, who controversially fired Goorjian.

Sydney Kings (2002–2008) 
The Sydney Kings hired Goorjian after the 2001–02 season to replace Brett Brown. Goorjian led the Kings to three consecutive NBL championships from 2003 to 2005. Goorjian coached Sydney to five Grand Final series in six years, despite being forced to constantly re-build the team after each season. He won his fifth NBL Coach of the Year award as the Kings went 27–3 during the 2007–08 regular season. However, they were unable to turn this success into a fourth championship, going down narrowly to the Melbourne Tigers.

South Dragons (2008–2009) 
On April 1, 2008, Goorjian signed a three-year contract with new Melbourne club South Dragons. Goorjian led the Dragons to the 2008–09 NBL title in his first season with them. He won his sixth Coach of the Year award with the Dragons in 2009. The Dragons folded at the end of the season despite their title win, prompting Goorjian to seek a position overseas.

Dongguan Leopards (2009–2015)
Brian Goorjian was the head coach of the Dongguan Leopards. After the 2014–2015 CBA Season ended, Goorjian left the Leopards.

Guangdong Tigers (2015–2016)
Goorjian stepped away from head coaching duties, and became associate coach of the Guangdong Southern Tigers in early 2015, responsible for player development, talent identification, scouting and game analysis.

Shanghai Sharks (2016–2018)
After the CBA season has finished, Goorjian became Special Advisor of the Shanghai Sharks in early 2016, responsible for player development, talent identification, scouting and game analysis. Following the 2017–2018 season he left the club.

Xinjiang Flying Tigers (2018–2019)
After leaving the Sharks, Goorijan moved to the Xinjiang Flying Tigers in 2018 as an assistant coach, and remained there for one season.

Illawarra Hawks (2020–2022)
On June 23, 2020, returned to Australia and signed with Illawarra Hawks of the NBL as their new head coach. He elected to not take up his third-year option with the Hawks in May 2022, instead moving to the role of special advisor for basketball operations.

National team career 
After Phil Smyth's less than one-year term as the Australian Boomers coach in 2001 which resulted in the team's shock non-qualification for the 2002 World Championships, Goorjian was appointed as coach in late 2001 when Smyth resigned and would hold the position until 2008. By becoming the Boomers coach, Goorjian was the first foreign born coach to the team in its history. Under his tutelage, the Boomers qualified for the 2004 Athens Olympics, where they finished ninth, dropping five places from their 2000 finish. At the 2008 Beijing Olympics, the boomers improved their ranking to finish 7th.

In November 2020, Goorjian returned as head coach for the Australian men's national basketball team for the 2020 Summer Olympics where the team won the bronze medal and Australia's first ever medal in Olympic men's basketball.

Coaching profile 
Having won 511 games at a winning percentage of 70% Goorjian's record exceeds that of Australian coaching legends in the other major professional leagues including Kevin Sheedy (AFL – 365), Allan Jeans (AFL – 358), Tom Hafey (AFL – 336), David Parkin (AFL – 306), Wayne Bennett (NRL – 294 wins) and Tim Sheens (NRL – 235). In 2003 the NBL Hall of Fame selection committee voted Brian Goorjian the best coach of the first 25 years of the National Basketball League. In one of the notable statistics in sport, Goorjian-coached teams finished no worse than the semi-finals every year from 1990–2009. He has also coached teams to a record 12 grand finals and won 'Coach of the Year' on six occasions.

Goorjian is also known for his intense coaching style (contrasting the laid back style of his early mentor Lindsay Gaze). His former assistant coach Bill Tomlinson says the detail he paid to defence was notable, as was the emphasis on strength and conditioning which often made Goorjian coached teams the fittest in the league. He said he sat down for his first six games in 1988, which he lost, and has stood during games ever since.

On October 10, 2013, Goorjian was named the coach of the Sydney Kings 25th Anniversary Team.

Coaching record

NBL

|- 
| align="left" |Eastside Melbourne Spectres
| align="left" |1988
|24||11||13|||| align="center" |8th ||—||—||—||—
| align="center" |Missed playoffs
|-class="sortbottom"
|- 
| align="left" |Eastside Spectres
| align="left" |1989
|24||14||10|||| align="center" |7th ||—||—||—||—
| align="center" |Missed playoffs
|-class="sortbottom"
|- 
| align="left" |Eastside Melbourne Spectres
| align="left" |1990
|26||18||8|||| align="center" |2nd ||2||0||2||
| align="center" |Semi-finalists
|-class="sortbottom"
|- 
| align="left" |Eastside Melbourne Spectres
| align="left" |1991
|26||17||9|||| align="center" |2nd ||5||3||2||
| align="center" |Grand Finalists
|-class="sortbottom"
|- 
| align="left" |South East Melbourne Magic
| align="left" |1992
|24||20||4|||| align="center" |1st ||7||6||1||
| align="center" |Champions
|-class="sortbottom"
|- 
| align="left" |South East Melbourne Magic
| align="left" |1993
|26||20||6|||| align="center" |2nd ||4||2||2||
| align="center" |Semi-finalists
|-class="sortbottom"
|- 
| align="left" |South East Melbourne Magic
| align="left" |1994
|26||19||7|||| align="center" |3rd ||3||1||2||
| align="center" |Semi-finalists
|-class="sortbottom"
|- 
| align="left" |South East Melbourne Magic
| align="left" |1995
|26||18||8|||| align="center" |3rd ||6||3||3||
| align="center" |Semi-finalists
|-class="sortbottom"
|- 
| align="left" |South East Melbourne Magic
| align="left" |1996
|26||19||7|||| align="center" |1st ||7||6||1||
| align="center" |Champions
|-class="sortbottom"
|- 
| align="left" |South East Melbourne Magic
| align="left" |1997
|30||22||8|||| align="center" |1st ||5||3||2||
| align="center" |Grand Finalists
|-class="sortbottom"
|- 
| align="left" |South East Melbourne Magic
| align="left" |1998
|30||26||4|||| align="center" |1st ||4||2||2||
| align="center" |Grand Finalists
|-class="sortbottom"
|- 
| align="left" |Victoria Titans
| align="left" |1998–99
|26||17||9|||| align="center" |2nd ||7||4||3||
| align="center" |Grand Finalists
|-class="sortbottom"
|- 
| align="left" |Victoria Titans
| align="left" |1999–2000
|28||20||8|||| align="center" |4th ||8||4||4||
| align="center" |Grand Finalists
|-class="sortbottom"
|- 
| align="left" |Victoria Titans
| align="left" |2000–01
|28||21||7|||| align="center" |4th ||6||3||3||
| align="center" |Semi-finalists
|-class="sortbottom"
|- 
| align="left" |Victoria Titans
| align="left" |2001–02
|30||20||10|||| align="center" |1st ||6||3||3||
| align="center" |Semi-finalists
|-class="sortbottom"
|- 
| align="left" |Sydney Kings
| align="left" |2002–03
|30||22||8|||| align="center" |1st ||8||6||2||
| align="center" |Champions
|-class="sortbottom"
|- 
| align="left" |Sydney Kings
| align="left" |2003–04
|35||27||8|||| align="center" |1st ||5||4||1||
| align="center" |Champions
|-class="sortbottom"
|- 
| align="left" |Sydney Kings
| align="left" |2004–05
|29||20||9|||| align="center" |1st ||8||6||2||
| align="center" |Champions
|-class="sortbottom"
|- 
| align="left" |Sydney Kings
| align="left" |2005–06
|32||25||7|||| align="center" |2nd ||5||3||2||
| align="center" |Grand Finalists
|-class="sortbottom"
|- 
| align="left" |Sydney Kings
| align="left" |2006–07
|33||20||13|||| align="center" |4th ||3||1||2||
| align="center" |Semi-finalists
|-class="sortbottom"
|- 
| align="left" |Sydney Kings
| align="left" |2007–08
|30||27||3|||| align="center" |1st ||8||4||4||
| align="center" |Grand Finalists
|-class="sortbottom"
|- 
| align="left" |South Dragons
| align="left" |2008–09
|30||22||8|||| align="center" |1st ||8||5||3||
| align="center" |Champions
|- 
| align="left" |Illawarra Hawks
| align="left" |2020–21
|36||20||16|||| align="center" |3rd ||3||1||2||
| align="center" |Semi-finalists
|- 
| align="left" |Illawarra Hawks
| align="left" |2021–22
|28||18||9|||| align="center" |2nd ||2||0||2||
| align="center" |Semi-finalists
|-class="sortbottom"
| align="left" |Career
| ||683||484||199|||| ||120||70||50||

Personal life 
Goorjian is an Australian citizen. He has a daughter with his wife, Amanda.

References

External links 
 College statistics
 Video interview with Brian Goorjian @ fiba.com

1953 births
Living people
American emigrants to Australia
American expatriate basketball people in Australia
American expatriate basketball people in China
American men's basketball coaches
American men's basketball players
American people of Armenian descent
Australian people of Armenian descent
Australian expatriate sportspeople in China
Australian men's basketball coaches
Australian men's basketball players
Australian Olympic coaches
Basketball players from California
Guards (basketball)
Melbourne Tigers players
National Basketball League (Australia) coaches
Olympic coaches
Pepperdine Waves men's basketball players
Sportspeople from Glendale, California
Sydney Kings coaches